Sandow is a series of three 1894 silent short actuality films by the Edison Studios featuring bodybuilder Eugen Sandow, directed by William K.L. Dickson. The series is considered a historically significant early film series.

Production and distribution

Promoter Florenz Ziegfeld, Jr. found that the audience was more fascinated by Sandow's bulging muscles than by the amount of weight he was lifting, so Ziegfeld had Sandow perform poses which he dubbed "muscle display performances"... and the legendary strongman added these displays in addition to performing his feats of strength with barbells. He added chain-around-the-chest breaking and other colorful displays to Sandow's routine. Sandow quickly became Ziegfeld's first star.

In 1894, Sandow featured in a short film by the Edison Studios. The film was of only part of the show and features him flexing his muscles rather than performing any feats of physical strength.  While the content of the film reflects the audience attention being primarily focused on his appearance it made use of the unique capacities of the new medium.  Film theorists have attributed the appeal being the striking image of a detailed image moving in synchrony, much like the example of the Lumière brothers' Repas de bébé where audiences were reportedly more impressed by the movement of trees swaying in the background than the events taking place in the foreground.  In 1894, he appeared in a short Kinetoscope film that was part of the first commercial motion picture exhibition in history.

References

External links
 
 
 
 

1894 films
American silent short films
Films directed by William Kennedy Dickson
American black-and-white films
Articles containing video clips
Documentary films about bodybuilding
1890s short documentary films
American short documentary films